Anacrusis thunberghiana is a species of moth of the family Tortricidae. It is found in Suriname.

References

Moths described in 1782
Atteriini
Moths of South America